Ernest Poole (born 8 August 1874, date of death unknown) was a Jamaican cricketer. He played in three first-class matches for the Jamaican cricket team in 1896/97.

See also
 List of Jamaican representative cricketers

References

External links
 

1874 births
Year of death missing
Jamaican cricketers
Jamaica cricketers
People from Manchester Parish